Vasilev Bay is the 9.6 km wide embayment indenting for 3.8 km the north coast of Livingston Island in the South Shetland Islands, Antarctica.  The bay is part of Hero Bay, entered between Siddins Point and Bezmer Point.

The feature is named for Nikola Vasilev (b. 1949), physician at St. Kliment Ohridski Base during the 1993/94 season who provided support for the Bulgarian Antarctic programme.

Location

Maps
 L.L. Ivanov et al. Antarctica: Livingston Island and Greenwich Island, South Shetland Islands. Scale 1:100000 topographic map. Sofia: Antarctic Place-names Commission of Bulgaria, 2005.
 L.L. Ivanov. Antarctica: Livingston Island and Greenwich, Robert, Snow and Smith Islands. Scale 1:120000 topographic map.  Troyan: Manfred Wörner Foundation, 2009.

References
 Vasilev Bay. SCAR Composite Antarctic Gazetteer
 Bulgarian Antarctic Gazetteer. Antarctic Place-names Commission. (details in Bulgarian, basic data in English)

External links
 Vasilev Bay. Copernix satellite image

Bays of Livingston Island